Vladyslav Kocherhin (born 30 April 1996) is a Ukrainian professional footballer who plays as a midfielder for Ekstraklasa club Raków Częstochowa and the Ukraine national team.

Club career
Kocherhin is a product of the Youth Sportive School ♯11 in Odesa and the FC Dnipro Sportive School. His first trainers in FC Dnipro were Volodymyr Knysh and Ihor Khomenko.

He made his debut as a substituted player in a second half-time for FC Dnipro in the match against FC Volyn Lutsk on 24 July 2016 in the Ukrainian Premier League and scored one goal.

He scored a hat-trick for Zorya Luhansk in a 5-1 away win against Inhulets Petrove on 2 August 2021.

In January 2022, Kocherhin agreed to join Polish Ekstraklasa side Raków Częstochowa on a three-year deal, starting from 1 July 2022. Due to the Russian invasion of Ukraine, his contract with Zorya was suspended under new FIFA rules. He was therefore able to join his new side earlier than planned and was officially announced as Raków's new signing on 26 March 2022.

International career
Kocherhin made his Ukraine national team debut on 8 September 2021 in a friendly against the Czech Republic, a 1–1 away draw.

Career statistics

Honours
Dnipro Reserves
Sait Nagjee Football Tournament: 2016

Raków Częstochowa
Polish Super Cup: 2022

Individual
Sait Nagjee Football Tournament top scorer: 2016

References

External links
 
 

1996 births
Living people
Footballers from Odesa
Association football midfielders
Ukraine international footballers
Ukraine youth international footballers
Ukraine under-21 international footballers
FC Dnipro players
FC Zorya Luhansk players
Raków Częstochowa players
Ukrainian Premier League players
Ekstraklasa players
Ukrainian footballers
Ukrainian expatriate footballers
Expatriate footballers in Poland
Ukrainian expatriate sportspeople in Poland